Tom Haywood (29 March 1909 – 4 April 1961) was an Australian professional rugby league footballer who played in the 1930s and 1940s.

Haywood played eight seasons with St. George between 1933 and 1940. A prop forward, Haywood played in the 1933 Grand Final.

References

St. George Dragons players
Australian rugby league players
1909 births
1961 deaths
Rugby league props
Rugby league players from Sydney